The Kenol–Isiolo Highway, is a planned dual carriage highway in Kenya. The highway would link Kenol, in Machakos County, to the towns of Ruiru and Thika, in Kiambu County, Kabati and Makuyu in Muranga County, Sagana and Kibirigwi in Kirinyaga County, Karatina and Kiganjo in Nyeri County, Nanyuki in Laikipia County, Timau in Meru County and Isiolo, in Isiolo County.

Location

The coordinates of the highway, in the town of Sagana, in Kirinyaga County are: 0°39'52.0"S, 37°12'29.0"E (Latitude:-0.664444; Longitude:37.208056).

Overview
This highway is part of an important road corridor that links the counties in the Mount Kenya region that it passes through, to markets in northern Kenya and neighboring Ethiopia. It is part of the Northern Corridor road network.

The highway is divided into two sections, namely (a) Kenol–Nyeri (b) Nyeri–Isiolo. The road is designated as a Class A road, and is under the jurisdiction of Kenya National Highway Authority.

Upgrading and widening
The highway, for the most part, follows the route of the existing single carriageway road, that is in various stages of disrepair. The Government of Kenya, through its parastatal Kenya National Highways Authority, plans to widen the road to a dual carriageway. As of January 2019, the design for the Kenol–Nyeri section was complete. At that time, it was expected that by June 2019, the design of the Nyeri–Isolo section would also be complete. Then the project is expected to move from the design stage to the procurement stage.

See also
 List of roads in Kenya
 East African Community

References

External links
Website of Kenya National Highway Authority

Roads in Kenya
Geography of Kenya
Transport in Kenya
Machakos County
Nairobi
Kiambu County
Murang'a County
Kirinyaga County
Nyeri County
Laikipia County
Meru County
Isiolo County